Gennadi Ivanovich Kostylev (born 27 September 1940) is a Russian professional football coach and a former player.

Honours
 Russian Second Division Zone Center best manager: 2005.

External links
 

1940 births
Living people
People from Kostiantynivka
Ukrainian emigrants to Russia
Soviet footballers
FC Energiya Volzhsky players
FC Volga Nizhny Novgorod players
FC Izhevsk players
Soviet football managers
Russian football managers
FC Rubin Kazan managers
PFC CSKA Moscow managers
Russian Premier League managers
FC Arsenal Tula managers
Association football midfielders